The 1948 Pau Grand Prix was a non-championship Formula One motor race held on 29 March 1948 at the Pau circuit, in Pau, Pyrénées-Atlantiques, France. The Grand Prix was won by Nello Pagani, for the second time running, driving the Maserati 4CL. Yves Giraud-Cabantous finished second and Charles Pozzi third.

Classification

Race

References

Pau Grand Prix
1948 in French motorsport
Pau
Pau Grand Prix